Elections were held in the Australian state of Western Australia on 7 April 1956 to elect 10 of the 30 members of the state's Legislative Council.

Results

Legislative Council

|}

Retiring Members

LCL 

 Les Craig (South-West)
 Frank Gibson (Suburban)

Candidates

Election results

Central

Metropolitan 

 Preferences were not distributed.

Midland

North

North-East

South

South-East

South-West

Suburban

West

See also

 Members of the Western Australian Legislative Council, 1956–1958

References

1956 elections in Australia
Elections in Western Australia